Mill Island may refer to

 Mill Island, Antarctica
 Mill Basin, Brooklyn, United States, formerly known as "Mill Island"
 Mill Island (Nunavut), Canada
 Mill Island (Moorefield, West Virginia), United States
 Ray Mill Island,  England 
 Temple Mill Island, England